Yumaguzino (Yomağuja) is a rural locality (a village) in Ilkineyevsky Selsoviet, Kuyurgazinsky District, Bashkortostan, Russia. The population was 155 as of 2010. There are 3 streets.

Geography 
Yumaguzino is located 33 km north of Yermolayevo (the district's administrative centre) by road. Rassvet is the nearest rural locality.

References 

Rural localities in Kuyurgazinsky District